This is a list of current general managers in the American Hockey League. In the American Hockey League, the general manager of a team typically controls player transactions and bears the primary responsibility on behalf of the hockey club during contract discussions with players.

Unlike in the NHL, The general manager is not normally the person who hires, fires, and supervises the head and assistant coaches, amateur and professional scouts, and all other hockey operations staff for their team, as these duties are usually assigned to the general manager of the each AHL affiliate's parent club, and performed in tandem with their identical duties at that level.

Current AHL general managers

References 

 
American Hockey League lists